Chitti is a short name for some Indians. It may refer to:

 Chitti Babu (Tamil actor), Indian comedian, presenter and actor.
 Chitti (character), main character in Enthiran (2010) and 2.0 (2018).
 Chitti Babu (musician), Indian classical musician
 Chitti Tammudu, 1962 Telugu film
 Chitti, 1995 Sinhala film

See also

 
 Chithi (disambiguation)
 Chiti (disambiguation)
 
 Citti (surname)